= Quasibodo =

Scientific classification
- Domain: Eukaryota
- (unranked): incertae sedis
- Genus: Quasibodo; Cath.Bernard, A.G.B.Simpson & D.J.Patterson, 2000
- Species: Q. laughtonii

Binomial name
- Quasibodo laughtonii Cath.Bernard, A.G.B.Simpson & D.J.Patterson, 2000

Species of eukaryote

Quasibodo is a genus of free-living flagellate protist containing the single species Quasibodo laughtonii. The species was described in 2000 from anoxic marine and freshwater sediments. The genus has not yet been placed in any family or higher taxon, and as of 2025 holds a classification of incertae sedis.
